George Murray Kay (23 November 1905 – 12 October 1991) was an association football player who represented New Zealand at international level.

Kay made his full All Whites debut in a 2–4 loss to Australia on 5 June 1933 and ended his international playing career with four A-international caps and one goal to his credit, his final cap an appearance in a 1–4 loss to Australia on 18 July 1936.

References 

1905 births
1991 deaths
New Zealand association footballers
New Zealand international footballers
Association footballers not categorized by position
British emigrants to New Zealand